Thirsk railway station is on the East Coast Main Line and serves the town of Thirsk, North Yorkshire, England. Its three-letter station code is THI.

The station is about  outside of Thirsk town centre and is actually on the edge of the village of Carlton Miniott.

There are four tracks, but only the outer two have platforms; the platform faces serving the innermost pair of tracks were removed in the 1970s in preparation for higher-speed main line running using InterCity 125 trains. The station is operated by TransPennine Express. Other train services are provided by the open-access operator Grand Central.

History
The station at Thirsk, which opened to the public on 31 March 1841, was originally named Newcastle Junction.

In 1933 Britain's first route-setting power signal box using a switch panel rather than a lever frame opened at Thirsk, to the specification of the LNER's signalling engineers A.F. Bound and A. E. Tattersall, forming the template for many such future installations on the nation's railway network. Larger schemes to a similar design followed at other locations on the former North Eastern Railway network, such as Hull Paragon (1938), Northallerton (1939) and York (1951 - the resignalling project was interrupted by the Second World War and not completed until after nationalisation). Thirsk signal box itself, after various alterations over the course of its life, eventually closed around 1989 under the York IECC signalling scheme.

In 2020, the government awarded £1 million from its Access for All fund to improve the accessibility at the railway station. There are now plans to install lifts and a new footbridge to enable step-free access to all platforms.

Facilities
The station has a staffed ticket office (on the southbound platform), which is open through the week (06:45-19:30 Mondays to Saturdays, 08:45-17:30 Sundays) and there is also self-service ticket machine available (this can be used for collecting pre-paid tickets as well as for purchasing when the ticket office is closed). There is a waiting shelter on the northbound platform and customer help points and digital CIS displays on both sides. Step-free access to both platforms is via a barrow crossing and only possible when the station is staffed.

Services

Events
1841 Station opened at the same time as the York - Darlington line.
1847 permanent water tower built.
1855 Connection to Leeds & Thirsk Railway line to Ripon via Melmerby opened.
Accidents occurred in 1867, 1870, 1875, 1879 and 1882.
1933 Britain's first "panel" route-setting power signal box opened at Thirsk.
1954 The first four carriages of the "Heart of Midlothian" express from King's Cross to Edinburgh composed of thirteen coaches derailed. The four carriages derailed after problems with signalling and points, no one was injured.
1959 Ripon services cease in September with closure of Melmerby branch line to all traffic.
1967 A goods wagon derailed which led to a collision with an express, 7 people were killed, 45 injured.

See also
Thirsk rail crash (1892)
Thirsk rail crash (1967)

References

External links 

Railway stations in North Yorkshire
DfT Category E stations
Former North Eastern Railway (UK) stations
Railway stations in Great Britain opened in 1841
Railway stations served by Grand Central Railway
Railway stations served by TransPennine Express
Thirsk